Opal's Steak House is a historic building located at 871 Park Avenue in Hot Springs, Arkansas. Opal's Steak House was constructed between 1946 and 1948 to serve tourists visiting the thermal springs in Hot Springs; its location on Park Avenue served travelers on nearby U.S. Route 70, the main highway between Little Rock and Hot Springs. The building was constructed in the Art Moderne style, which is visible in its curved stucco facade and horizontal features. In 1952, the restaurant changed its name to the Golden Drumstick Restaurant; the building has since served as a clothing store, a furniture store, and a laundromat. The building was added to the National Register of Historic Places on February 11, 2004.

References

Commercial buildings on the National Register of Historic Places in Arkansas
Streamline Moderne architecture in Arkansas
Buildings and structures in Hot Springs, Arkansas
Restaurants in Arkansas
Steakhouses in the United States
National Register of Historic Places in Hot Springs, Arkansas
Restaurants on the National Register of Historic Places